Worzel Gummidge is a British television fantasy comedy series, produced by Southern Television for ITV, based on the Worzel Gummidge books by English author Barbara Euphan Todd. The programme starred Jon Pertwee as the titular scarecrow and Una Stubbs as Aunt Sally. It ran for four series in the UK from 1979 to 1981. On a countdown of the greatest British children's programmes, this series was number 50 in the 50 Greatest Kids TV Shows on Channel 5 on 8 November 2013. Channel 4 reprised the show in 1987 as Worzel Gummidge Down Under, which was set in New Zealand.

Outline

In 1979, a television adaptation of Worzel Gummidge was produced by ITV station Southern Television for transmission on the ITV network. It was written by Keith Waterhouse and Willis Hall, and starred former Doctor Who actor Jon Pertwee as Worzel and Una Stubbs as Aunt Sally, a life-size fairground doll and Worzel's femme fatale. This was a significant change from the original books, where Aunt Sally is Worzel's aunt, and Worzel is married to Earthy Mangold, a character who does not appear in the series. The Crowman, who made Worzel and some of his other scarecrow friends, is played by Geoffrey Bayldon, who had played the title role in Catweazle. Regular and occasional guest appearances were made by well-known TV actors of the time, including Barbara Windsor, Billy Connolly, Bill Maynard, Joan Sims, Lorraine Chase, Bernard Cribbins, Connie Booth, David Lodge and Mike Reid.

According to Jon Pertwee's memoirs, the idea for the series began as a proposed film about the Worzel Gummidge character by Waterhouse and Hall which would have been "about the scarecrow equivalent" of the Peasants' Revolt, with the scarecrows rising up against farmers who were going to burn them when the farming season had finished. Pertwee was approached to play the lead character by producer Gareth Wigan. When this project was unable to secure the funds it needed for a distribution deal, Pertwee encouraged the writers to create a television pilot instead, and via his agent pitched the idea to Shaun Sutton, then Head of Drama at the BBC. Sutton turned down the project, which he felt was "too way out", as did Philip Jones at Thames Television. Pertwee later recalled that at this point he "began to lose faith in the project", but Southern Television's Lewis Rudd heard about it and enthusiastically agreed that his company would make the series.

A total of four series with 30 episodes and an extended Christmas special were made between 1979 and 1981. When Southern lost its contract to broadcast on ITV, the new contract-holder, TVS, did not renew the show, despite a press campaign led by the Daily Star. Attempts were made to continue the series: for it to be produced independently by Southern for the BBC and then for it to be produced in Ireland, but these failed. HTV continued with their plans to produce the show in Ireland but these fell through because of trade union problems, as did attempts by the same company to make further episodes in England; the scripts that Waterhouse & Hall had written for the Irish episodes were, however, published in book form. Pertwee and Stubbs starred in the musical Worzel Gummidge in 1981 at the Birmingham Repertory Theatre which also starred Lucy Benjamin (then Lucy Jane Baker) as Sue. Jon Pertwee's final TV appearance as Worzel was in 1995, to celebrate 40 years of ITV.

"Worzel's Song", sung by Jon Pertwee, was released in 1980, reaching number 33 in the UK charts.

Filming locations
The main locations for filming were the villages of Stockbridge, King's Somborne and Braishfield, along with Broughton for the fourth series, all of which are near Romsey in Hampshire. The Scatterbrook Farm scenes were filmed at Pucknall in Braishfield; Michelmersh was used for the scenes in the Scatterbrook barn. Worzel's scarecrow stand was filmed near Fishpond's Farm between Braishfield and King's Somborne at OS grid location SU378274.

New Zealand
The programme remained in limbo until Channel 4, along with Television New Zealand commissioned Worzel Gummidge Down Under in 1986, which was shot on location in New Zealand; It ran for two series totaling 22 episodes. Only Pertwee and Stubbs remained from the original cast, with Bruce Phillips joining the cast as the Crowman (Geoffrey Bayldon declined to reprise the role) and Olivia Ihimaera-Smiler, daughter of prominent Māori author Witi Ihimaera joining as one of the children. The Lord of the Rings director Peter Jackson received an early credit for his work providing special effects for the series.

Michael Grade, the newly appointed head of Channel 4, cancelled the series when the New Zealand version drew low audience figures.

Storyline
In the series, Worzel Gummidge was a scarecrow that could come to life. Living in Ten Acre Field, he would often visit the nearby village of Scatterbrook. He befriended two children, brother and sister John and Sue Peters, who often tried to clear up the messes he created. Worzel had a collection of interchangeable turnip, mangelwurzel, and swede heads; each suiting a particular occasion or allowing him to perform a certain task. He also had his own language, Worzelese. Worzel's catchphrases were: "A cup o' tea an' a slice o' cake", "I'll be bum-swizzled" and "Bozzy MCoo". He was madly in love with Aunt Sally, a vain, cruel-hearted fairground coconut-shy doll who considered herself a lady and far too good for a common scarecrow such as Worzel. Aunt Sally often exploits Worzel for her own ends (in one episode, she promises to marry him if he frees her from a junkshop washing machine, but she never has any intention of going through with it). The Crowman says there are good and bad Aunt Sallys (S04E05). The one Worzel likes has delusions of grandeur and is evil, in her constant nastiness to him.

The rationale for the move to New Zealand in Down Under was that Aunt Sally is purchased by a visiting museum curator from New Zealand, and Worzel follows her into the luggage chute.

Worzelese
Worzel and the other scarecrows sometimes spoke in their own "language",  which was simply English spelled out letter-by-letter with "wor" appended to each. Words with three letters or less had "dip" appended, while longer words ended with "zel". Children who spoke Worzelese as a language game therefore gained practice with their spelling. However, Worzelese is far harder to speak than other play languages like Pig Latin and never really caught on.

UK cast

Episode list

Series 1
"Worzel's Washing Day" (25 February 1979) The Peters family moves into a caravan on Scatterbrook Farm, and John and Sue Peters meet Worzel Gummidge, a scarecrow who can come to life.
"A Home Fit for Scarecrows" (4 March 1979) John and Sue offer Worzel a proper chair for his home in the barn if he will teach them Worzelese; the scarecrow also gets the idea to steal a full set of furniture from the villagers.
"Aunt Sally" (11 March 1979) Worzel takes the afternoon off to go to the village fête to see his intended, Aunt Sally, even though she considers herself to be too good for him. Aunt Sally takes advantage of his feelings for her and persuades him to exchange places with her so she can escape being sold to a museum.
 "The Crowman" (18 March 1979) Worzel begs his creator, the Crowman, to make him a handsome head so he can get a wife. After a disastrous visit to the home of Mrs. Bloomsbury-Barton, the scarecrow learns that it is more important to be handsome inside than out.
"A Little Learning" (25 March 1979) Worzel turns the farm upside down looking for his Clever Head. When he finds it at the nearby school and puts it on, he encounters a teacher who takes him for a genius.
"Worzel Pays a Visit" (1 April 1979) When Worzel is told that the runaway Aunt Sally is working as a housemaid at Mrs. Bloomsbury-Barton's home, he decides to pay her a call. But the mistress is away, and Sally pretends to be the lady of the house and invites Worzel in for tea, resulting in chaos.
"The Scarecrow Hop" (8 April 1979) Aunt Sally is in a despondent mood after being sacked from her position as lady's maid to Mrs. Bloomsbury-Barton. To cheer her up, Worzel asks her to the charity ball.

Series 2
"Worzel and the Saucy Nancy" (6 January 1980)
"Worzel's Nephew" (13 January 1980)
"A Fishy Tale" (20 January 1980)
"The Trial of Worzel Gummidge" (27 January 1980)
"Very Good, Worzel" (3 February 1980)
"Worzel in the Limelight" (10 February 1980)
"Fire Drill" (17 February 1980)
"The Scarecrow Wedding" (24 February 1980)

Series 3
"Moving On" (1 November 1980)
"Dolly Clothes Peg" (8 November 1980)
"A Fair Old Pullover" (15 November 1980)
"Worzel the Brave" (22 November 1980)
"Worzel's Wager" (29 November 1980)
"The Return of Dafthead" (6 December 1980)
"Captain Worzel" (13 December 1980)
"Choir Practice" (20 December 1980)

Christmas special
"A Cup o' Tea and a Slice o' Cake" (27 December 1980)Unusually this double-length musical special did not have the Worzel Gummidge title sequence, "A Cup o' Tea and a Slice o' Cake" being its only on-screen title followed by "Starring Jon Pertwee" as per the standard titles.

Series 4
"Muvver's Day" (31 October 1981)
"The Return of Dolly Clothes-Peg" (7 November 1981)
"The Jumbly Sale" (14 November 1981)
"Worzel in Revolt" (21 November 1981)
"Will the Real Aunt Sally...?" (28 November 1981)
"The Golden Hind" (5 December 1981)
"Worzel's Birthday" (12 December 1981)

New Zealand series

Series 5
"As The Scarecrow Flies" (4 October 1987)
"The Sleeping Beauty" (11 October 1987)
"Full Employment" (18 October 1987)
"Worzel's Handicap" (25 October 1987)
"King of the Scarecrows" (1 November 1987)
"Ten Heads Are Better Than One" (8 November 1987)
"Worzel to the Rescue" (15 November 1987)
"Slave Scarecrow" (22 November 1987)
"The Traveller Unmasked" (29 November 1987)
"A Friend in Need" (6 December 1987)

Series 6
"Stage Struck" (29 January 1989)
"A Red Sky in T'Morning"(5 February 1989)
"Them Thar Hills" (12 February 1989)
"The Beauty Contest" (19 February 1989)
"Bulbous Cauliflower" (26 February 1989)
"Weevily Swede" (5 March 1989)
"Elementary My Dear Worty" (12 March 1989)
"Dreams of Avarish" (19 March 1989)
"Runaway Train" (26 March 1989)
"Aunt Sally, R.A." (2 April 1989)
"Wattle Hearthbrush" (9 April 1989)
"The Bestest Scarecrow" (16 April 1989)

Stage musical 
A stage musical adaptation, titled Worzel Gummidge - The Musical, was created by the TV series creators Keith Waterhouse and Willis Hall with music by Denis King and featuring the original TV principal cast Jon Pertwee, Una Stubbs and Geoffrey Bayldon. The musical first premiered at the Birmingham Repertory Theatre for the 1980 Christmas season before receiving rave reviews and transferring to the Cambridge Theatre in London's West End from 22 December 1981 and extending to 27 February 1982. The Original London 1981 Cast Album was recorded at Abbey Road Studios; It featured 15 songs and 4 bonus tracks titled The Worzel Gummidge Christmas Maxi Single.

Legacy
 In the early 1980s, British Labour Party leader Michael Foot was satirically compared to Worzel Gummidge as a criticism of his allegedly unkempt appearance.
 A Worzel Gummidge figurine was fixed to Jon Pertwee's coffin for his funeral at Putney Vale Cemetery.
 In 2016, Miwk Publishing released The Worzel Book, the first complete history of the series, written by Stuart Manning. The book gathered more than 40 interviews with surviving cast and crew, plus hundreds of rare and unseen photographs. The League of Gentlemen's Mark Gatiss contributed a foreword.
 Popular professional wrestling review podcast OSW Review frequently refers to wrestler and former WWE road agent Rene Goulet as Worzel due to his similar appearance and hairstyle to the character.

Home media releases
 Worzel Gummidge Box SetSeries 1–4 and Christmas SpecialRegion 4 (Australia and New Zealand)
 Worzel Gummidge UltimateSeries 1–4, Christmas Special, and Down UnderRegion 2 (UK)
 Worzel Gummidge The complete collection Series 1–4, Down Under Series 1–2 and Christmas Special Region 2 (UK)
 In 2018, the original film negatives for Worzel Gummidge were located and catalogued by researchers Richard Latto and Stuart Manning, having been thought lost for many years. The Christmas Special episode "A Cup o' Tea and a Slice o' Cake" was restored from the film negatives and released on DVD.
 Worzel Gummidge: The Complete Series 1–4 Blu-ray was released 26th December 2022.  The release is fully restored from the original camera negatives and includes extensive bonus material.

References and notes

External links
Screenonline: Worzel Gummidge
 

1979 British television series debuts
1989 British television series endings
1970s British children's television series
1980s British children's television series
British children's comedy television series
British children's fantasy television series
New Zealand children's television series
ITV children's television shows
British television shows based on children's books
1980s New Zealand television series
Television shows produced by Southern Television
English-language television shows

zh:華澤爾·古米治